Montenegran women's national under-17 football team represents Montenegro in international youth football competitions.

FIFA U-17 Women's World Cup

The team has never qualified for the  FIFA U-17 Women's World Cup

UEFA Women's Under-17 Championship

The team has never qualified

See also
Montenegro women's national football team

References

External links

U17
Youth football in Montenegro
Women's national under-17 association football teams